Polypoetes rufipuncta is a moth of the family Notodontidae. It is found in south-eastern Brazil.

References

Moths described in 1894
Notodontidae of South America